The Katharine Burr Blodgett Medal and Prize is a gold medal awarded annually by the Institute of Physics to "recognise contributions to the organisation or application of physics in an industrial or commercial context." The medal is accompanied by a prize of £1000.

History

At its inception in 2008, the award was named the "Business and Innovation Medal". In 2012, it was renamed the "Swan Medal and Prize" in memory of Sir Joseph Swan, a chemist, physicist, and early developer of the incandescent light bulb. Since 2016, the award was renamed again to commemorate Katharine Burr Blodgett, inventor of low-reflectance "invisible" glass (Langmuir–Blodgett film), and the first woman to receive a degree in physics from Cambridge University.

Medallists
The following have been award one of these medals:

Katharine Burr Blodgett Medal and Prize
2019 Chris Hancock for "designing and patenting an electro-surgery platform."
2018 Michael Begg and James Ramage, Tesla Engineering, for "the transformation of Tesla Engineering Ltd from a manufacturer of conventional magnets for particle accelerators into a world leader of magnets for high-energy physics, MRI and oncology equipment."
2017 Cliff Jones, University of Leeds, for "inventions in the area of liquid crystal displays, and his role in the founding and commercial success of Displaydata."
2016 Graeme Malcolm, M Squared Lasers for "his role in founding M Squared Lasers, and his contribution to the design and manufacture of transformative award-winning photonics products."

Swan Medal and Prize
2015 Iain Baikie, KP Technology, for "contributions to the development of Kelvin Probe (KP) method instrumentation."
2014 Michael Christopher Payne, University of Cambridge, for "development of computational techniques that have revolutionised materials design and facilitated the industrial application of quantum mechanical simulations."
2013 Stuart Parkin, IBM Research for "discoveries of the underlying physics and of novel device architectures that have established the field spintronics."
2012 Sir David McMurtry and John Deer, Renishaw plc, for "founding Renishaw plc and leading it to become one of the world’s principal manufacturers of metrology equipment."

Business and Innovation Medal
2011 Graham John Batey, Oxford Instruments, for "sustained outstanding contribution to the application of low temperature physics in an industrial high technology environment."
2010 Sir Michael Pepper, University College London, for "translating advances in semiconductor physics into the commercial arena", which included their participation in founding Toshiba Research Europe, Cambridge Laboratory, and TeraView Ltd.
 2009 Sir Richard Friend & Dr David Fyfe, University of Cambridge, for "guiding the company Cambridge Display Technology (CDT) to a pre-eminent position in the development of light-emitting polymers and in the development of the technology for flat-panel displays and lighting."
 2008 Donal Denvir, Andor Technology, for "founding Andor Technology, and for leading an R&D programme that has kept the company at the forefront of innovation."

See also
 Institute of Physics Awards
 List of physics awards
 List of awards named after people

References

Awards established in 2008
Awards of the Institute of Physics